Emily Newton Dunn (born 1972) is an English TV presenter and video game designer and producer.

She co-presented the Channel 4 TV programme Bits with Aleks Krotoski and Emily Booth.

Since leaving television presenting, she has worked in the videogames industry including roles with Criterion Games as producer on the Burnout series. She later worked for Electronic Arts as part of EA Bright Light as both a designer and producer, working on games such as Harry Potter and the Half Blood Prince.

References 

Living people
English television presenters
1972 births